Tommy Stringer is an American politician. He was a member of the South Carolina House of Representatives from the 18th District, serving from 2009 to 2022. He stepped down due to family and health circumstances. He is a member of the Republican party.

References

Living people
1959 births
Republican Party members of the South Carolina House of Representatives
21st-century American politicians